Sheung Wan is an area in Hong Kong, located in the north-west of Hong Kong Island, between Central and Sai Ying Pun. Administratively, it is part of the Central and Western District. The name can be variously interpreted as Upper District (occupying relatively high ground compared to Central and Wan Chai), or Gateway District (perhaps a reference to the location where the British first entered and occupied Hong Kong).

History
Sheung Wan was one of the earliest settled places by the British, and belonged to the historical Victoria City. The site of the original occupation of Hong Kong Island by British forces in 1842 was at Possession Street, between Queen's Road Central and Hollywood Road. A plaque to this effect can be found in Hollywood Road Park at the top of Possession Street. The foot of Possession Street, Possession Point, was at that time on the shoreline, but is now several hundred yards inland due to reclamation.

Geography
Sheung Wan is surrounded by Sai Ying Pun in the west, Central in the east, Victoria Harbour in the north and Victoria Peak in the south. Part of the Mid-Levels is located within Sheung Wan. The border between Central and Sheung Wan consists of the entire Castle Lane, the entire Aberdeen Street, the entire Wing Kut Street, the section of Des Voeux Road Central between Wing Kut Street and Wing Wo Street, the section of Wing Wo Street north of Des Voeux Road Central, the section of Connaught Road Central between Wing Wo Street and Rumsey Street, and the section of Rumsey Street from Connaught Road Central to the waterside. Garfield Mansion is in Sheung Wan while Green Field Court is in Central. The border's location south of Seymour Road in the Mid-Levels is unknown.

Features
 Asia Art Archive
 Blake Garden
 Hollywood Road Park
 Hong Kong Museum of Medical Sciences
 Man Mo Temple
 Pak Tsz Lane Park
 Sheung Wan Civic Centre
 Sheung Wan Market
 Shun Tak Centre
 Soho, Hong Kong (also part of Central)
 The Center
 Tung Wah Hospital
 Western Market
 YMCA of Hong Kong Bridges Street Centre

The Sheung Wan Route
The Sheung Wan Route is one part of Central and Western Heritage Trail designed by the Antiquities and Monuments Office and Leisure and Cultural Services Department. The route covers 35 historic buildings and sites in Sheung Wan.

Streets
Streets in Sheung Wan include:
 Aberdeen Street, marking the border with Central
 Bonham Strand and Bonham Strand West
 Bridges Street
 . Named after Charles Saint George Cleverly, the 2nd Surveyor General of Hong Kong Government.
 Des Voeux Road Central and Des Voeux Road West
 Gough Street
 Hillier Street
 Hollywood Road (also in Central)
 Jervois Street
 Ladder Street and other ladder streets
 Man Wa Lane
 Morrison Street
 Possession Street
 Pound Lane, a ladder street
 Queen's Road Central and Queen's Road West
 Rumsey Street
 Shing Wong Street, a ladder street
 Tai Ping Shan Street, a popular shopping street
 Upper and Lower Lascar Row
 Wellington Street, Hong Kong (also in Central)
 Wing Lee Street
 
 Wing Sing Street

Transport
Sheung Wan is served by the Sheung Wan station, formerly the western terminus of the Island line of the MTR metro system. Kennedy Town became the new terminus of the Island on 28 December 2014.

Trams also run through Sheung Wan, and one of the tram termini, Western Market, is located at the junction of Des Voeux Road Central and Morrison Street near its namesake.

The Hong Kong–Macau Ferry Terminal in the Shun Tak Centre has ferries and helicopters to Macau and to several destinations in Mainland China.

Numerous bus routes run through Sheung Wan. Central (Macau Ferry) Bus Terminus, located next to the Hong Kong-Macau Ferry Terminal, is one of the largest bus termini on Hong Kong Island.

Economy

Education
Sheung Wan is in Primary One Admission (POA) School Net 11.

Due to the high French expatriate population, the French International School of Hong Kong previously operated a Kindergarten campus in Shops 2-4 on the ground floor of Tung Fai Gardens in Sheung Wan.

See also
 Central and Western Heritage Trail: Sheung Wan Route
 Dr Sun Yat-sen Historical Trail
 List of places in Hong Kong

References

External links

 cuhk.edu.hk

 
Central and Western District, Hong Kong